Bilbija is a Bosnian surname, derived from bilbil, the Slavic variant of the Turkish word bülbül meaning "nightingale". Notable people with the surname include:

Filip Bilbija (born 2000), German footballer
Nemanja Bilbija (born 1990), Bosnian footballer, son of Milorad
Nenad Bilbija (born 1984), Slovene handball player
Milorad Bilbija (born 1964), retired Bosnian footballer, father of Nemanja

Bosnian surnames
Serbian surnames